The Indian Institute of Teacher Education (IITE) is a state university located at Gandhinagar, Gujarat, India. It was established in 2010 by the Government of Gujarat and focuses on teacher education.

History
With a vision of exporting teachers from India, Narendra Modi, serving as Chief Minister of Gujarat from 2001 to 2014, was the main proponent of the institute. The curriculum was designed by a team of experts led by Kireet Joshi. The institute was established by an act of the Government of Gujarat in 2010.

References

External links

Colleges of education in India
Universities in Gujarat
Education in Gandhinagar
Educational institutions established in 2010
2010 establishments in Gujarat